Rõõsa is a village in Kose Parish, Harju County in northern Estonia.

References

 

Villages in Harju County